Leave Scars is the third studio album released by the American thrash metal band, Dark Angel, released on January 24, 1989. It was their first album with vocalist Ron Rinehart and bassist Mike Gonzalez (who joined just prior to the release of Darkness Descends), and the last to feature guitarist Jim Durkin. Leave Scars was Dark Angel's most successful release, peaking at number 159 on the Billboard 200.

Musical style
Leave Scars saw Dark Angel expand the thrash metal sound of their previous two albums, We Have Arrived and Darkness Descends. It introduced a more technical and progressive element to the band's music than the raw sound of its predecessors, presenting two instrumentals and several songs lasting more than five minutes. This album can also be seen as the genesis of the direction Dark Angel would take on their 1991 follow-up album Time Does Not Heal, which saw them expanding their technical sound even further.

Reception

Leave Scars received a positive-to-mixed review from AllMusic's Eduardo Rivadavia, who gave the album a rating of two-and-a-half out of five. He noted that, with Leave Scars, Dark Angel "continued to perfect their already quite impressive musical chops, while simultaneously refining their brutal thrashing" and called it "the album which inaugurates their progressive thrash phase, as increasingly complex structures and frequent, unexpected time changes result in numbers of epic proportions." In the closing in his review, however, Rivadavia wrote, "Ultimately, Leave Scars only fails to score higher marks because Dark Angel forgot to add a final, crucial ingredient to its potent recipe: melody. And sure enough, addressing this small oversight would result in their magnum opus, 1991's colossal Time Does Not Heal."

Track listing
All songs written by Gene Hoglan and Jim Durkin, except where noted.

Credits
Ron Rinehart - vocals
Eric Meyer - rhythm and lead guitar, backing vocals
Jim Durkin - rhythm and lead guitar, violin bow, assorted instruments, backing vocals
Mike Gonzalez - bass, backing vocals
Gene Hoglan - drums, rhythm guitar, assorted instruments, backing vocals
Ron Eriksen - guest vocals on "The Promise of Agony"

References

Dark Angel (band) albums
1989 albums
Combat Records albums